Eloise Wellings (née Poppett) (born 9 November 1982 in White Plains, New York, United States) is an Australian long-distance runner. She represented her country at the 2006 Commonwealth Games in Melbourne, the 2010 edition in New Delhi and the 2014 edition in Glasgow, and the 2012 Summer Olympics.  In 2016, she made the finals of both the 5,000m and 10,000m races at 2016 Summer Olympics.

She was the gold medalist over 5000 metres at the 2003 Summer Universiade. She has also competed internationally in cross country running – her best finish to date was 22nd in the long race at the 2006 IAAF World Cross Country Championships.

She won two consecutive titles at the Zatopek 10,000 metres in 2009, 2010 and 2015.

Personal life 
Wellings is a Christian. She stated that she missed out on the Sydney 2000 Olympics due to an injury and thought her God was punishing her. She went to church with a school friend and began to understand her God's love for her. She stated, “Once I found Jesus I was free to use the gifts he had given me and it didn’t matter if I succeeded or not.” Wellings also missed out on the Athens and Beijing Olympics due to injury. However, she states, “All of my disappointing results and disappointing injuries and heartbreak missing three Olympics, there was always this belief and faith that my identity is in Jesus and that’s my foundation. When you’ve got that, you can’t be shaken. Every time I get up to train, I just ask that he be glorified, that he give me the strength to do it, that he help give me the right thoughts to think – and not necessarily that I win but that he would be made known to people as I run.”

Achievements

Personal bests
1500 metres - 4:13.63 min (2006)
3000 metres - 8:41.78 min (2006)
5000 metres - 14:54.11 min (2006)
10,000 metres - 31:14.94 min (2016)
Marathon - 2:25:10 (2022)

References

1982 births
Living people
Australian female long-distance runners
Athletes (track and field) at the 2006 Commonwealth Games
Athletes (track and field) at the 2010 Commonwealth Games
Athletes (track and field) at the 2018 Commonwealth Games
Sportspeople from New York (state)
Athletes (track and field) at the 2012 Summer Olympics
Athletes (track and field) at the 2016 Summer Olympics
Olympic athletes of Australia
World Athletics Championships athletes for Australia
Athletes (track and field) at the 2014 Commonwealth Games
Commonwealth Games competitors for Australia
Universiade medalists in athletics (track and field)
Australian Christians
Universiade gold medalists for Australia
People from White Plains, New York
20th-century Australian women
21st-century Australian women